The January 2011 Iraq suicide attacks were a series of five consecutive suicide bombings in Iraq.

18 January attack
On 18 January 2011, a bomber killed 63 people and injured around 150 in the city of Tikrit. The bombing occurred near a police facility where several hundred people were gathered. The attack was blamed on a lack of security at the event; a local police official said that "[t]he security procedures weren't good. They did not meet the demands of such a gathering." A local councilman, Abdullah Jabara, said that the attack was committed by Al-Qaeda, and was intended "to shake the security in the province and to bring back instability to Tikrit."

19 January attacks
In the incident in Baqubah, the attacker reportedly fired on guards at a police building before driving an ambulance with explosives into the building, where the vehicle was blown up. This attack killed either 13 or 14 people, while injuring between 60 and 70. The building collapsed after the attack, burying survivors of the initial explosion. The bombing was estimated to have used  of explosives and left a crater  in diameter.

In Ghalbiyah, a suicide bomber killed two people and injured 15 out of a crowd marching from Baghdad to Karbala, a holy city. An official from the Diyala Governorate and three of his bodyguards were wounded in this incident.

20 January attacks
On 20 January, at least 56 people died when two car bombs detonated near Karbala during the holy festival of Arba'een. In Baquba, three others were killed in a separate suicide bombing.

See also

24 January 2011 Iraq bombings

References

January suicide attacks
2010s in Karbala
January 2011 suicide attacks
Attacks on buildings and structures in 2011
Attacks on police stations in the 2010s
January 2011 suicide attacks
Crime in Karbala
Explosions in Karbala
History of Diyala Governorate
History of Tikrit
January 2011 suicide attacks 
Islamic terrorist incidents in 2011
January 2011 crimes
January 2011 events in Iraq
Massacres in 2011
January 2011 suicide attacks
January 2011 suicide attacks
January suicide attacks
Vehicular rampage in Asia
January 2011 suicide attacks